Kenneth Desmond Smith (30 April  1922, Bishop Auckland, Durham; – 31 May 1998, Selly Oak, Birmingham) was an English cricketer.

Kenneth Smith was a right-handed batsman who played regularly for Leicestershire County Cricket Club between 1951 and 1952. He made an unbeaten 70 at Northampton in 1950. He scored 621 runs in 26 first-class matches at an average of 17.25 with two fifties and taking 12 catches.

His sons David and Paul both represented Warwickshire.

External links
 Cricinfo profile

1922 births
1998 deaths
English cricketers
Leicestershire cricketers
Northumberland cricketers